Revelling/Reckoning is the 11th studio album by singer-songwriter Ani DiFranco, released in 2001 on Righteous Babe Records. It is a double album of winding, narrative, acoustic-based songs.

The lead track of Reckoning, "Your Next Bold Move", was included on the 2002 political compilation GASCD.

Track listing
All songs by Ani DiFranco.

Revelling
 "Ain't That The Way" – 5:14
 "O.K." – 2:51
 "Garden Of Simple" – 3:54
 "Tamburitza Lingua" – 5:07
 "Marrow" – 5:19
 "Heartbreak Even" – 3:36
 "Harvest" – 1:04
 "Kazoointoit" – 3:51
 "Whatall Is Nice" – 4:36
 "What How When Where (Why Who)" – 5:58
 "Fierce Flawless" – 5:04
 "Rock Paper Scissors" – 6:00
 "Beautiful Night" – 6:25

Reckoning
 "Your Next Bold Move" – 5:47
 "This Box Contains..." – 0:29
 "Reckoning" – 6:02
 "So What" – 5:03
 "Prison Prism" – 1:34
 "Imagine That" – 4:01
 "Flood Waters" – 0:47
 "Grey" – 5:22
 "Subdivision" – 3:57
 "Old Old Song" – 4:22
 "Sick Of Me" – 5:21
 "Don't Nobody Know" – 1:17
 "School Night" – 4:54
 "That Was My Love" – 1:03
 "Revelling" – 5:08
 "In Here" – 4:16

Personnel
 Ani DiFranco – record producer, mixer, acoustic guitar, drums, electric guitar, vocals, tambur, tongue drum, key bass, baritone guitar, bass, tenor guitar, piano, shaker, honky keys
 Shane Endsley – trumpet, shaker, voice
 Daren Hahn – drums, percussion, voice
 Jason Mercer – acoustic bass, electric bass, bowed bass, voice, kazoo
 Hans Teuber – clarinet, saxophone, bass clarinet, flute, voice
 Julie Wolf – rhodes, accordion, singing, clavinet, piano, organ, melodica, pianet,
 Scot Fisher – voice
 Maceo Parker – saxophone, singing
 Jon Hassell – trumpet
 Mark Hallman – singing
 Lloyd Maines – pedal steel
 Andrew 'Goat Boy' Gilchrist – recording, mixer

Charts

References

External links
 

Ani DiFranco albums
2001 albums
Righteous Babe Records albums